Nie Tao (born 18 January 1987 in Tianjin, China) is a Chinese professional footballer who currently plays for Chinese club Tianjin Kunshengxing as a full-back.

Club career
Nie started his professional career with Chinese Super League side Tianjin Teda in 2009. On 19 May 2009, he made his senior debut in the last round of 2009 AFC Champions League group stage match which Tianjin Teda beat Central Coast Mariners 1–0, coming on as a substitute for Han Yanming in the 82nd minutes. 

On 28 February 2018, Nie transferred to China League One side Beijing Enterprises.

Career statistics 
Statistics accurate as of match played 31 December 2020.

Honours

Club
Tianjin Teda
 Chinese FA Cup: 2011

References

External links
 

1989 births
Living people
Chinese footballers
Footballers from Tianjin
Tianjin Jinmen Tiger F.C. players
Beijing Sport University F.C. players
China League One players
Chinese Super League players
Association football defenders